Om Shanthi Om is a 2015 Tamil language supernatural drama film directed by D. Suryaprabhakar and produced by Arumai Chandran.The film stars Srikanth and Neelam Upadhyaya, while Vijay Ebenezer composes the film's music. The film released in October 2015. It is loosely based on the American fantasy film Heart and Souls.

Plot
The film opens with a bus accident in which there is only one survivor — Vasu (Srikanth). The film flashes forward to six months later. Vasu works in an automobile showroom and falls in love with Shanthi (Neelam Upadhyaya), who he also hires as his employee. Vasu begins to notice five individuals following him everywhere he goes. He confronts them, and they tell him that they need his help, and he agrees. As he fulfills their wishes, he learns that they are people who were involved in the same bus accident as him, and they have appeared as spirits so that their last wishes can be fulfilled. Shanthi mistakes the signs of Vasu talking with the ghosts as a psychological problem, and the lovers separate. Can Vasu fulfill the spirits' wishes and get back together with Shanthi?

Cast

 Srikanth as Vasu
 Neelam Upadhyaya as Shanthi
 Aadukalam Naren as Lingesan
 Junior Balaiah as Balasubramaniam
 Rajendran as Vavval Pandi
 Ayyappa Baiju
 Master Siddharth as Akash
 Maulik Chauhan as Mahesh
 Gowthami Chowdary as Sabitha
 Saran Shakthi as Kumar
 Vinodhini Vaidyanathan as Kumar's mother
 MAK Raman
 Arumugavel
 Yuvan Swang
 Nithyashree

Production
The film began its first schedule in February 2013 with little fanfare and scenes were shot around Trichy.

Soundtrack 
The music was composed by Vijay Ebenezer.

Critical reception
The Times of India rated the film 2  out of 5, comparing the concept with Venkat Prabhu's Massu Engira Masilamani and noted, "while Venkat Prabhu used the premise of the hero being able to see ghosts to tell a revenge masala, D Suryaprabaakar gives us an emotional drama."

References

2015 films
2010s Tamil-language films
Indian horror films
2015 directorial debut films
2015 horror films